The Venerable  William Raymond Birt  (25 August 1911 – 11 March 2002) was the Archdeacon of Berkshire  from 1973 until 1978.

Birt was educated at Christ's Hospital. His first job was as a schoolmaster at Trent College. Later he was a sub-editor at the Daily Sketch and then assistant editor of Play Rights Publications. He served in the war of 1939 to 1945 as a Major in the 22nd Dragoons, during which he was mentioned in despatches. When peace returned he was the editor of Winchester Publications and then Country Life Books. In 1956 he entered Ely Theological College to prepare for ordination. He was a curate at Caversham until 1959 after which he was Vicar of St George, Newbury, Berkshire. He was Rector of  West Woodhay from 1971 to 1978; and Priest in charge of Hamstead Marshall until 1981. From 1986, he was title as an archdeacon emeritus.

References

1911 births
People educated at Christ's Hospital
Alumni of Ely Theological College
British Army personnel of World War II
Archdeacons of Berkshire
2002 deaths